Neil Forbes Grant  (1 August 1882 – 24 December 1970) was an English journalist, memorialist, and playwright.

History
Before being known as a dramatist, Grant had an extensive career as a journalist, serving as foreign editor of The Morning Post for seven years. His most successful play, Possessions, was first performed in January 1925, at the London Vaudeville, then had a long run at the Garrick Theatre.

Works
Dusty Ermine became the 1936 film Dusty Ermine, aka Love in the Alps, American title Hideout in the Alps.
Possessions
The Three Kisses
On Dartmoor
The Age of Leisure
Petticoat Influence

Recognition
Grant was appointed a CBE in 1919.

Notes and references

20th-century English dramatists and playwrights
1882 births
1970 deaths
Commanders of the Order of the British Empire